Kaghazi may refer to:
 Kaghazi, Gilan
 Kaghazi, Isfahan